The 2012 Tour de las Américas was the 12th season of the Tour de las Américas, the main professional golf tour in Latin America since it was established in 2000. It was the final season of the Tour de las Américas and was superseded by the PGA Tour Latinoamérica, which began in September 2012.

The Order of Merit was won by Paraguay's Marco Ruiz.

Schedule
The following table lists official events during the 2012 season.

Unofficial events
The following events were sanctioned by the Tour de las Américas, but did not carry official money, nor were wins official.

Order of Merit
The Order of Merit was based on prize money won during the season, calculated using a points-based system.

Notes

References

External links
Official site

Tour de las Américas
Tour de las Americas